Bentley Gavin Vass is a South African politician who has been the Northern Cape MEC for Co-operative Governance, Human Settlements and Traditional Affairs since February 2018. He was sworn in as a Member of the Northern Cape Provincial Legislature in October 2017. Vass is a member of the African National Congress and the party's deputy provincial chairperson.

Politics
Vass is a member of the African National Congress. He was elected the party's deputy provincial chairperson in May 2017, succeeding Kenny Mmoiemang who stood down. Vass was also speaker and executive mayor of the Namakwa District Municipality.

Provincial government
On 3 October 2017, Vass was sworn in as a Member of the Northern Cape Provincial Legislature. He filled the seat left vacant by the resignation of Dawid Rooi. Premier Sylvia Lucas appointed him as the Member of the Executive Council for Co-operative Governance, Human Settlements and Traditional Affairs on 15 February 2018. Vass succeeded Alvin Botes, who resigned from the provincial government to become a Member of the National Assembly. Following the 2019 general election, Zamani Saul was elected as the new premier. On 28 May 2019, he announced that Vass would remain in his position.

References

External links
People's Assembly – Bentley Vass
Northern Cape Provincial Legislature profile

Living people
Members of the Northern Cape Provincial Legislature
People from the Northern Cape
African National Congress politicians
Year of birth missing (living people)